Pavel Kotov and Roman Safiullin were the defending champions but chose not to defend their title.

Lukáš Klein and Alex Molčan won the title after defeating Antoine Hoang and Albano Olivetti 1–6, 7–5, [10–6] in the final.

Seeds

Draw

References

External links
 Main draw

Challenger La Manche - Doubles
2021 Doubles
Chall